Target Lake is a lake in Houston County, in the U.S. state of Minnesota.

Target Lake was so because an early shooting range was located near the lake.

References

Lakes of Minnesota
Lakes of Houston County, Minnesota